Gonduz (also Romanized as Gondūz, Gandūz, and Gondooz) is a village in Boghrati Rural District, Sardrud District, Razan County, Hamadan Province, Iran.

Population
At the 2006 census, its population was 1,572, in 354 families.

References 

Populated places in Razan County
Populated places in Iran